Anja Ringgren Lovén is the founder of the charity organization DINNødhjælp, which has been protecting and rescuing  children accused of being witches in Nigeria since 2012. Lovén became known in 2016 when a photo from one of her rescue actions of witch children went viral In the picture, Anja squats in front of a small naked and starved boy, who she gives water with her water bottle. Anja subsequently took the boy to a children's center in Nigeria, where he miraculously survived. She named him Hope, and the rescue operation became a major catalyst in Lovén's struggle to tell the rest of the world about witch children and the superstition that prevailed in Nigeria.

Career

She graduated from Frederikshavn Gymnasium in 1998. After high school, Lovén traveled with her twin sister to Israel in Kibbutz and spent the following couple of years traveling around the Middle East. In 2001, she was trained as a stewardess at Maersk Air, but six months later Lovén quit her job to look after her mother, who was declared terminal with lung cancer. After her mother's death, Lovén first moved to Aalborg in 2002 and a few years later to Aarhus, where she got a job in a clothing store in Bruun's Gallery. Later, she became store manager in the Butler Loft.

In 2009, she travelled to Malawi as an observer for the National Church Aid for three months. When she returned home, she began to raise money for a school renovation project in Tanzania, where she traveled on her own. In 2012, she founded DINNødhjelp, while working as a salesman in the clothing store RAW in Aarhus. The following year, she quit her job and sold everything she owned to pursue her dream of saving the so-called 'witch children' in Nigeria who are accused of being witches and ostracized or tortured to death because of the widespread superstition in Nigeria.

In 2014, to open an orphanage in Nigeria, Lovén and Nigerian law student David Emmanuel Umem founded DINNet Relief's sister organization African Children's Aid, Education and Development Foundation (ACAEDF).

In 2015, Lovén and Umem bought a large piece of land in the state of Akwa Ibom in Nigeria, where, with the help of Engineers Without Borders, they built the Land of Hope Children's Center with, among other things, a children's hospital and a business school. Land of Hope is a fenced-in, three-acre site with space for 100 children, designed to provide a safe and loving environment for the children and at the same time as an important element in the fight against superstition in the country.

Lovén works and lives alternately in Denmark and Nigeria, where she manages DINNet relief and heads Land of Hope with Umem.

Lovén has been giving lectures since 2014 on what it means to sell everything you own to pursue your dream. In the lectures, she also talks, among other things, about life at the Land of Hope Children's Center and how to bring about the superstition in Nigeria. She is today one of Denmark's most booked speakers.

Personal life

Anja Ringgren Lovén was born and raised in Frederikshavn.

In her private life, Anja's partner is David Emmanuel Umem, and together they have son David Jr., who was born August 13, 2014.

Documentary interviews

Lovén has starred in several documentaries about her work in Nigeria. Here among Danish documentaries such as:”Helvedes Helte” (DR2), ”En dansker redder verden – Anja Ringgren Lovén” (DR)", ”Anja og Heksebørnene” (DR2) and ”Anjas Afrika” (DR). In addition, in 2018 she co-starred in the German documentary: "Hexenkinder in Nigeria: Diese Heldin retted ihnen das Leben".

Accomplishments

2016 The World's Most Inspiring Person  OOOM Magazine
2016 Niels Ebbesen Medal
2017 Paul Harris Fellowship 
Hope Award 2017

In addition, Lovén has been nominated for both Danes of the Year 2017  and the Nordjyske Initiative Award 2015.

Lovén's work in Nigeria was recognized by the Dalai Lama, who invited Lovén to India to personally thank and acknowledge the work she is doing in Nigeria. The meeting was broadcast in the documentary "Anja's Orphanage" on DR2 on April 23, 2018.

References

External links
Official Site 

1978 births
People from Frederikshavn
Founders of charities
Critics of witch hunting
Living people
Danish expatriates in Nigeria
Modern witch hunts